Abdul Qadir Fitrat was governor of Da Afghanistan Bank from 2007 to 2011. He fled to the United States and is now wanted by the Afghani government. He is currently residing among the large Afghan-American community in Northern Virginia.

Fitrat was born in Badakhshan Province of Afghanistan, he belongs to the Tajik ethnic group. He attended primary school in his native province and secondary school in Kabul. He then moved to Pakistan and received a degree in economics from the International Islamic University. He immigrated to the United States and earned a master's degree from Wright State University in Dayton, Ohio. By the late 1990s he began working for the International Monetary Fund (IMF) in Washington. Between 2000 and 2001, he worked for First Union National Bank in Northern Virginia and later for the World Bank. During the Karzai administration, he was appointed as the governor of Afghanistan's central bank.

Kabul Bank scandal and fleeing the country

Fitrat became one of the main figures after the 2010 Kabul Bank scandal, when its chairman Sherkhan Farnood and other insiders were spending the bank's $1 billion for their own personal lavish style living as well as lending money under the table to family, relatives and friends. In June 2011, the Afghan government issued an arrest warrant for Fitrat. In October 2012, Afghan President Hamid Karzai ordered Fitrat to return from the U.S. to Afghanistan.

References

 Interview: Afghan Central Bank Chief Quits Post, Cites 'Imminent Dangers'
 Profile: Abdul Qadeer Fitrat - BBC News
 Afghan central bank governor Abdul Qadeer Fitrat flees
 Topic - Abdul Qadir Fitrat

Living people
Governors of Da Afghanistan Bank
Afghan educators
Afghan economists
Afghan Tajik people
Year of birth missing (living people)